Colt Defender may refer to:

 Colt Defender (pistol) (M1911 variant)
 Colt Defender Mark I